Aidil Bin Mohamad (born 10 August 1980 in Sarawak) is a former Malaysian footballer who played as a goalkeeper for Sarawak in the Liga Super.

A veteran goalkeeper for Sarawak, Aidil has played for Sarawak senior team since 2007. He was a leading figure to Sarawak promotion campaign in the 2011 Malaysia Premier League, only conceding 16 goals throughout the season as Sarawak finished runners-up in the league.

At the end of 2015 Malaysia Super League season, he announced his retirement from football. A year later, he return to Sarawak for 2017 Malaysia Super League campaign.

References

External links
 Profile at Sarawak FA

1980 births
Living people
Malaysian footballers
Sarawak FA players
People from Sarawak
Malaysia Super League players
Association football goalkeepers